RapCity is a Canadian television program that airs on the MuchMusic cable channel. It is not to be confused with the American TV show of the same name, Rap City.

The show features a selection of the newest and vintage music videos from Canadian hip hop and American hip hop artists. RapCity began several years after MuchMusic first went on the air in 1984, and is still in existence.  The program was created by director/producer Michele Geister after petitioning to Programme Director John Martin that a hip hop show was overdue for the Canadian market as well as the music channel's credibility.  Music enthusiast, club DJ, Geister began her MuchMusic career as a master control operator then editor.    Her efforts and abilities paid off with the launch of Soul in the City (Much's first specialty show) when asked by Michael Williams to help develop his concept- a weekly hour-long program focusing on Urban music---the first of its kind in Canada.    The explosion of rap and hip hop videos being sent for SITC was calling for the addition of a show dedicated to the new genre.   Soul in the City broadcast several rap specials in 1987 before the new show was given permission to begin production in 1988.

The show's original host was Michael Williams; later, the show was hosted by Oliver then Master T., and later Namugenyi Kiwanuka, who left MuchMusic in 2003. After that, occasionally, a hip hop artist would guest-host RapCity. The show was relaunched as a live, one-hour program on January 13, 2011 with a new host, Tyrone "T-RexXx" Edwards. Five-time freestyle champion Charron was the first ever retired Champion on RapCity in March 2011. As of August 2011, Jae Ari is the most recent retired Champion on RapCity who will be placed in a Winner's circle for future battles with other winners.

Originally RapCity aired once a week then expanded to five half hours a week and eventually became a weekly show in the fall of 2007, airing on Saturday nights at 11:00PM Eastern Time. The relaunched RapCity currently airs live on Thursdays at 10:00PM Eastern Time.

References

External links 
 Rap City website

1984 Canadian television series debuts
Much (TV channel) original programming
Hip hop television
1980s Canadian music television series